The Man in the Iron Mask (French ; died 19 November 1703) was an unidentified prisoner of state during the reign of King Louis XIV of France (1643–1715). Warranted for arrest on 28 July 1669 under the pseudonym of "Eustache Dauger", he was incarcerated on 24 August and held for 34 years in the custody of the same jailer, in four successive French prisons, including the Bastille. When he died there on 19 November 1703, his inhumation certificate bore the pseudonym of "Marchioly", leading several 19th century historians to conclude the prisoner was Italian diplomat Ercole Antonio Mattioli.

His true identity remains a mystery, even though it has been extensively debated by historians, and various theories have been expounded in numerous books, articles, poems, plays, and films. Among the oldest theories is one proposed by the French philosopher and writer Voltaire, who claimed in the second edition of his  (1771) that the prisoner was an older, illegitimate brother of Louis XIV. This assertion of a royal connection was echoed later by authors who proposed variants of this aristocratic solution. 

What emerges from these documents is that he was jailed for "what he had seen", "what he knew", and "what he was employed to do" before his arrest. Legend has it that no one ever saw his face, as it was hidden by a mask of black velvet cloth, later misreported by Voltaire as an iron mask. Official documents reveal, however, that the prisoner was made to cover his face only when travelling between prisons after 1687, or when going to prayers within the Bastille in the final years of his incarceration; modern historians believe the latter measure was imposed by Saint-Mars solely to increase his own prestige at the end of his career, thus causing persistent rumours to circulate about this seemingly important prisoner.

This solution, however, was disproved in 1953 when previously unpublished family letters were discovered by another French historian, Georges Mongrédien, who concluded that the enigma remained unsolved owing to the lack of reliable historical documents about the prisoner's identity and the cause of his long incarceration.

The Man in the Iron Mask has been the subject of many works of fiction, most prominently in 1850 by Alexandre Dumas. A section of his novel The Vicomte of Bragelonne: Ten Years Later—the final installment of his D'Artagnan saga—features this prisoner, portrayed as Louis XIV's identical twin and forced to wear an iron mask. In 1840, Dumas had first presented a review of the popular theories about the prisoner extant in his time in the chapter , published in the eighth volume of his non-fiction . This approach was adopted by many subsequent authors, and speculative works have continued to appear on the subject.

Prisoner

Arrest and imprisonment
The earliest surviving records of the masked prisoner are from 19 July 1669, when Louis XIV's minister, the Marquis de Louvois, sent a letter to Bénigne Dauvergne de Saint-Mars, governor of the prison of Pignerol (which at the time was part of France). In his letter, Louvois informed Saint-Mars that a prisoner named "Eustache Dauger" was due to arrive in the next month or so.

He instructed Saint-Mars to prepare a cell with multiple doors, one closing upon the other, which were to prevent anyone from the outside listening in. Saint-Mars was to see Dauger only once a day to provide food and whatever else he needed. Dauger was to be told that if he, Dauger, spoke of anything other than his immediate needs he would be killed, but, according to Louvois, the prisoner should not require much since he was "only a valet".

Historians have noted that the name Eustache Dauger was written in a handwriting different from that used in the rest of the letter's text, suggesting that a clerk wrote the letter under Louvois' dictation, while someone else, very likely Louvois, added the name afterward.

Dauger was arrested by Captain Alexandre de Vauroy, garrison commander of Dunkerque, on 28 July and taken to Pignerol, where he arrived on 24 August. Evidence has been produced to suggest that the arrest was actually made in Calais and that not even the local governor was informed of the event – Vauroy's absence being explained away by his hunting for Spanish soldiers who had strayed into France via the Spanish Netherlands.

The first rumours of the prisoner's identity (specifically as a Marshal of France) began to circulate at this point.

Masked man serves as a valet

The prison at Pignerol, like the others at which Dauger was later held, was used for men who were considered an embarrassment to the state and usually held only a handful of prisoners at a time.

Saint-Mars's other prisoners at Pignerol included Count Ercole Antonio Mattioli, an Italian diplomat who had been kidnapped and jailed for double-crossing the French over the purchase of the important fortress town of Casale on the Italian border. There was Nicolas Fouquet, Marquis of Belle-Île, a former superintendent of finances who had been jailed by Louis XIV on the charge of embezzlement, and the Marquis de Lauzun, who had become engaged to the Duchess of Montpensier, a cousin of the king, without the king's consent. Fouquet's cell was above that of Lauzun.

In his letters to Louvois, Saint-Mars describes Dauger as a quiet man, giving no trouble, "disposed to the will of God and to the king", compared to his other prisoners, who were always complaining, constantly trying to escape, or simply mad.

Dauger was not always isolated from the other prisoners. Wealthy and important ones usually had manservants; Fouquet for instance was served by a man called La Rivière. These servants, however, would become as much prisoners as their masters and it was thus difficult to find people willing to volunteer for such an occupation. Because La Rivière was often ill, Saint-Mars applied for permission for Dauger to act as servant for Fouquet. In 1675, Louvois gave permission for such an arrangement on condition that he was to serve Fouquet only while La Rivière was unavailable and that he was not to meet anyone else; for instance, if Fouquet and Lauzun were to meet, Dauger was not to be present.

It is an important point that the man in the mask served as a valet. Fouquet was never expected to be released; thus, meeting Dauger was no great matter, but Lauzun was expected to be set free eventually, and it would have been important not to have him spread rumours of Dauger's existence or of secrets he might have known. Historians have also argued that 17th-century protocol made it unthinkable that a gentleman, let alone an aristocrat, would serve as a manservant, casting some doubt on speculation that Dauger was in some way related to the king.

After Fouquet's death in 1680, Saint-Mars discovered a secret hole between Fouquet and Lauzun's cells. He was sure that they had communicated through this hole without detection by him or his guards and thus that Lauzun must have been made aware of Dauger's existence. Louvois instructed Saint-Mars to move Lauzun to Fouquet's cell and to tell him that Dauger and La Rivière had been released.

Other prisons

Lauzun was freed in 1681. Later that same year, Saint-Mars was appointed governor of the prison of the Exiles Fort (now Exilles in Italy). He went there, taking Dauger and La Rivière with him. La Rivière's death was reported in January 1687; in May, Saint-Mars and Dauger moved to Sainte-Marguerite, one of the Lérins Islands, half a mile offshore from Cannes. It was during the journey to Sainte-Marguerite that rumours spread that the prisoner was wearing an iron mask. Again, he was placed in a cell with multiple doors.

On 18 September 1698, Saint-Mars took up his new post as governor of the Bastille prison in Paris, bringing Dauger with him. He was placed in a solitary cell in the prefurnished third chamber of the Bertaudière tower. The prison's second-in-command, de Rosarges, was to feed him. Lieutenant du Junca, another officer of the Bastille, noted that the prisoner wore "a mask of black velvet". The masked prisoner died there on 19 November 1703 and was buried the next day under the name of "Marchioly".

Popular interest

In 1711, King Louis' sister-in-law, Elizabeth Charlotte, Princess Palatine, sent a letter to her aunt, Sophia, Electress of Hanover, stating that the prisoner had "two musketeers at his side to kill him if he removed his mask". She described him as very devout, and stated that he was well treated and received everything he desired. However, the prisoner had already been dead for eight years by that point and the Princess had not necessarily seen him for herself; rather, she was quite likely reporting rumours she had heard at court.

The fate of the mysterious prisoner—and the extent of the apparent precautions his jailers took—created significant interest in his story and gave birth to many rumours and legends. Many theories exist about his identity and the cause of his incarceration, and a very large number of books and articles have been written about the case during the last 350 years. Some of these theories were presented after the existence of reliable, contemporary documents was widely known. Still later commentators have presented their own theories, some of them based on embellished versions of the original tale.

Theories about his identity that were popular during his time included that he was a Marshal of France; the English Henry Cromwell, son of Oliver Cromwell; or François, Duke of Beaufort. Later, many authors such as Voltaire and Alexandre Dumas suggested other theories about the man in the mask.

Candidates

King's relative
Voltaire claimed that the prisoner was a son of Anne of Austria and Cardinal Mazarin, and therefore an illegitimate half-brother of Louis XIV. However, the sincerity of this claim is uncertain.

King's twin brother 
In a 1965 essay Le Masque de fer, French novelist Marcel Pagnol, supporting his hypothesis in particular on the circumstances of Louis XIV's birth, claims that the Man in the Iron Mask was indeed a twin but born second, and hence the younger, and would have been hidden in order to avoid any dispute over the throne holder. At the time there was a controversy over which one of twins was the elder: The one born first, or the one born second, who was then thought to have been conceived first.

The historians who reject this hypothesis (including Jean-Christian Petitfils), highlight the conditions of childbirth for the queen: It usually took place in the presence of multiple witnesses – the main court's figures. But according to Marcel Pagnol, immediately after the birth of the future Louis XIV, Louis XIII took his whole court to the Château de Saint-Germain's chapel to celebrate a Te Deum in great pomp, contrary to the common practice of celebrating it several days before childbirth.

Aligned with the hypothesis of Louis XIV having had a twin, a thorough examination of the French Kings' genealogy shows many twin births, in the Capetian dynasty, as well as in the House of Valois, the House of Bourbon, and the House of Orléans. 

Alexandre Dumas explored a similar hypothesis in his book The Vicomte de Bragelonne, where the prisoner was instead an identical twin of Louis XIV. This book has served as the basis – even if loosely adapted – for many film versions of the story.

According to Marcel Pagnol's hypothesis, this twin was then born in 1638 and grew up on the Island of Jersey under the name James de la Cloche. He would supposedly later conspire with Roux de Marcilly against Louis XIV, and be arrested in Calais in 1669.

King's father 
In 1955, Hugh Ross Williamson argued that the man in the iron mask was the natural father of Louis XIV. According to this theory, the "miraculous" birth of Louis XIV in 1638 would have come after Louis XIII had been estranged from his wife Anne of Austria for 14 years.

The theory then suggests that Cardinal Richelieu, the king's minister, had arranged for a substitute, probably an illegitimate grandson of Henry IV, to become intimate with the queen and father an heir in the king's stead. At the time, the heir presumptive was Louis XIII's brother Gaston, Duke of Orléans, who was Richelieu's enemy. If Gaston became king, Richelieu would quite likely have lost both his job as minister and his life, and so it was in his best interests to thwart Gaston's ambitions.

Supposedly, the substitute father then left for the Americas but in the 1660s returned to France with the aim of extorting money for keeping his secret, and was promptly imprisoned. This theory would explain the secrecy surrounding the prisoner, whose true identity would have destroyed the legitimacy of Louis XIV's claim to the throne had it been revealed.

This theory had been suggested by British politician Hugh Cecil, 1st Baron Quickswood, who nonetheless added that the idea has no historical basis and is entirely hypothetical. Williamson held that to say it is a guess with no solid historical basis is merely to say that it is like every other theory on the matter, although it makes more sense than any of the other theories. There is no known evidence that is incompatible with it, even the age of the prisoner, which Cecil had considered a weak point; and it explains every aspect of the mystery.

French general

In 1890, Louis Gendron, a French military historian, came across some coded letters and passed them on to Étienne Bazeries in the French Army's cryptographic department. After three years, Bazeries managed to read some messages in the Great Cipher of Louis XIV. One of them referred to a prisoner and identified him as General . One of the letters written by Louvois made specific reference to de Bulonde's crime.

At the Siege of Cuneo in 1691, Bulonde was concerned about enemy troops arriving from Austria and ordered a hasty withdrawal, leaving behind his munitions and wounded men. Louis XIV was furious and in another of the letters specifically ordered him "to be conducted to the fortress at Pignerol where he will be locked in a cell and under guard at night, and permitted to walk the battlements during the day with a 330 309." It has been suggested that the 330 stood for masque and the 309 for full stop. However, in 17th-century French avec un masque would mean "in a mask".

Some believe that the evidence of the letters means that there is now little need of an alternative explanation for the man in the mask. Other sources, however, claim that Bulonde's arrest was no secret and was actually published in a newspaper at the time and that he was released after just a few months. His death is also recorded as happening in 1709, six years after that of the man in the mask.

Valet
In 1801, revolutionary legislator Pierre Roux-Fazillac stated that the tale of the masked prisoner was an amalgamation of the fates of two separate prisoners, Ercole Antonio Mattioli (see below) and an imprisoned valet named "Eustache d'Auger".

Lang (1903) presented a theory that "Eustache d'Auger" was a prison pseudonym of a man called "Martin", valet of the Huguenot Roux de Marcilly. After his master's execution in 1669, the valet was taken to France, possibly by abduction. A letter from the French Foreign minister has been found rejecting an offer to arrest Martin: He was simply not important. 

Noone (1988) pointed out that the minister was concerned Dauger should not communicate, rather than that his face should be concealed. Later, Saint-Mars elaborated upon instructions that the prisoner should not be seen during transportation. The idea of keeping Dauger in a velvet mask was Saint-Mars's own, to increase his self-importance. What Dauger had seen or done is still a mystery.

In 2016, the American historian Paul Sonnino suggested that Eustache Dauger could have been a valet of Cardinal Mazarin's treasurer, Antoine-Hercule Picon. A native from Languedoc, Picon, upon entering the service of Colbert after Mazarin's death, might have picked up a valet from Senlis, where the name "Dauger" abounds. In his book, Sonnino asserts that Mazarin led a double life, "one as a statesman, the other as a loan shark", and that one of the clients he embezzled was Henrietta Maria, the widow of Charles I of England. According to Sonnino's theory, Louis XIV was complicit and instructed his ambassador in England to stonewall Charles II over the return of his parents' possessions. In 1669, however, Louis wanted to enlist Charles in a war against the Dutch and therefore worried about the subject of Mazarin's estate entering into the negotiations. Sonnino concludes by stating that Eustache Dauger, who might have been Picon's valet, was arrested and incarcerated for revealing something about the disposition of Mazarin's fortune, and that this is why he was threatened with death if he disclosed anything about his past.

In 2021, the British historian Josephine Wilkinson supported the theory proposed earlier by Jean-Christian Petitfils, whereby the prisoner was a valet—perhaps to Henrietta of England—who had committed some indiscretion which risked compromising the relations between Louis XIV and Charles II at a sensitive time during the negotiations of the Secret Treaty of Dover against the Dutch Republic. In July 1669, Louis had suddenly and inexplicably fallen out with Henrietta and, since the two had previously been very close, it didn't go unnoticed. Wilkinson therefore suggested a link between this event and this valet's arrest in Calais, later that month, under the pseudonym of "Eustache Dauger".

Son of Charles II
Barnes (1908) presents James de la Cloche, the alleged illegitimate son of the reluctant Protestant Charles II of England, who would have been his father's secret intermediary with the Catholic court of France.

One of Charles's confirmed illegitimate sons, the Duke of Monmouth, has also been proposed as the man in the mask. A Protestant, he led a rebellion against his uncle, the Catholic King James II. The rebellion failed and Monmouth was executed in 1685. But in 1768, a writer named Saint-Foix claimed that another man was executed in his place and that Monmouth became the masked prisoner, it being in Louis XIV's interests to assist a fellow Catholic like James who would not necessarily want to kill his own nephew. Saint-Foix's case was based on unsubstantiated rumors and allegations that Monmouth's execution was faked.

Italian diplomat
Another candidate, much favored in the 1800s, was Fouquet's fellow prisoner Count Ercole Antonio Mattioli ( Matthioli). He was an Italian diplomat who acted on behalf of the debt-ridden Charles IV, Duke of Mantua in 1678, in selling Casale, a strategic fortified town near the border with France. A French occupation would be unpopular, so discretion was essential, but Mattioli leaked the details to France's Spanish enemies, after pocketing his commission once the sale had been concluded, and they made a bid of their own before the French forces could occupy the town. Mattioli was kidnapped by the French and thrown into nearby Pignerol in April 1679. The French took possession of Casale two years later.

George Agar-Ellis reached the conclusion that Mattioli was the state prisoner commonly called The Iron Mask when he reviewed documents extracted from French archives in the 1820s. His book, published in English in 1826, was translated into French and published in 1830. German historian Wilhelm Broecking came to the same conclusion independently seventy years later.  Robert Chambers' Book of Days supports the claim and places Matthioli in the Bastille for the last 13 years of his life.

Since that time, letters sent by Saint-Mars, which earlier historians missed, indicate that Mattioli was held only at Pignerol and Sainte-Marguerite and was not at Exilles or the Bastille and, therefore, it is argued that he can be discounted.

Eustache Dauger de Cavoye
In his letter to Saint-Mars announcing the imminent arrival of the prisoner who would become the "man in the iron mask", Louvois gave his name as "Eustache Dauger". Historically, this was deemed to be a pseudonym, and a succession of historians therefore attempted to find out the prisoner's real identity. Among them, Maurice Duvivier wondered if, instead, "Eustache Dauger" might not be the real name of a person whose life and history could be traced; he therefore combed the archives for surnames such as Dauger, Daugers, d'Auger, d'Oger, d'Ogiers and similar forms. He discovered the family of François d'Oger de Cavoye, a captain of Cardinal Richelieu's guard of musketeers, who was married to Marie de Sérignan, a lady-in-waiting at the court of Louis XIV's mother, Queen Anne of Austria. François and Marie had 11 children, of whom six boys and three girls survived into adulthood. 

Their third son was named Eustache, who signed his name as "Eustache Dauger de Cavoye". He was born on 30 August 1637 and baptised on 18 February 1639. When his father and  two eldest brothers were killed in battle, Eustache became the nominal head of the family. In his 1932 book, Duvivier published evidence that this man had been involved in scandalous and embarrassing events, first in 1659, then again in 1665, and that he had also been linked with l'Affaire des Poisons.

Disgrace
In April 1659, Eustache Dauger de Cavoye and others were invited by the duke of Vivonne to an Easter weekend party at the castle of Roissy-en-Brie. By all accounts, it was a debauched affair of merry-making, with the men involved in all sorts of sordid activities, including attacking an elderly man who claimed to be Cardinal Mazarin's attorney. It was also rumoured, among other things, that a black mass was enacted and that a pig was baptised as "Carp" in order to allow them to eat pork on Good Friday.

When news of these events became public, an inquiry was held and the various perpetrators jailed or exiled. There is no record as to what happened to Dauger de Cavoye but, in 1665, near the Château de Saint-Germain-en-Laye, he allegedly killed a young page boy in a drunken brawl involving the Duc de Foix. The two men claimed that they had been provoked by the boy, who was drunk, but the fact that the killing took place close to where Louis XIV was staying at the time meant that this crime was deemed a personal affront to the king and, as a result, Dauger de Cavoye was forced to resign his commission. His mother died shortly afterwards. In her will, written a year earlier, she passed over her eldest surviving sons Eustache and Armand, leaving the bulk of the estate to their younger brother Louis. Eustache was restricted in the amount of money to which he had access, having built up considerable debts, and left with barely enough for "food and upkeep".

Affair of the Poisons

In his 1932 book, Duvivier also linked Eustache Dauger de Cavoye to the Affair of the Poisons, a notorious scandal of 1677–1682 in which people in high places were accused of being involved in black mass and poisonings. An investigation had been launched, but Louis XIV instigated a cover-up when it appeared that his mistress Madame de Montespan was involved. The records show that, during the inquiry, the investigators were told about a surgeon named Auger, who had supplied poisons for a black mass that took place before March 1668. Duvivier became convinced that Dauger de Cavoye, disinherited and short of money, had become Auger, the supplier of poisons, and subsequently "Eustache Dauger", the man in the mask.

In a letter sent by Louvois to Saint-Mars on 10 July 1680, a few months after Fouquet's death in prison while "Eustache Dauger" was acting as his valet, the minister adds a note in his own handwriting, asking how it was possible that Dauger had made certain objects found in Fouquet's pockets—which Saint-Mars had mentioned in a previous correspondence, now lost—and "how he got the drugs necessary to do so". Duvivier suggested that Dauger had poisoned Fouquet as part of a complex power struggle between Louvois and his rival Colbert.

Dauger de Cavoye in prison at Saint-Lazare
In 1953, however, French historian Georges Mongrédien published historical documents confirming that, in 1668, Eustache Dauger de Cavoye was already held at the Prison Saint-Lazare in Paris—an asylum, run by monks, which many families used in order to imprison their "black sheep"—and that he was still there in 1680, at the same time that "Eustache Dauger", the man in the mask, was in custody in Pignerol, hundreds of miles away in the south.

These documents include a letter dated 20 June 1678, full of self-pity, sent by Dauger de Cavoye to his sister, the Marquise de Fabrègues, in which he complains about his treatment in prison, where he had already been held "for more than 10 years", and how he was deceived by their brother Louis and by Clérac, their brother-in-law and the manager of Louis's estate. Dauger de Cavoye also wrote a second letter, this time to the king but undated, outlining the same complaints and requesting his freedom. The best the king would do, however, was to send a letter to the head of Saint-Lazare on 17 August 1678, telling him that "M. de Cavoye should have communication with no one at all, not even with his sister, unless in your presence or in the presence of one of the priests of the mission". The letter was signed by the king and Colbert.

A poem written by Louis-Henri de Loménie de Brienne, an inmate in Saint-Lazare at the time, indicates that Eustache Dauger de Cavoye died as a result of heavy drinking in the late 1680s. Historians consider all this proof enough that he was not involved in any way with the man in the mask.

Historical documents and archives

History of the Bastille archives
When the Bastille was stormed on 14 July 1789, the mob were surprised to find only seven prisoners, as well as a room full of neatly kept boxes containing documents that had been carefully filed since 1659. These archives held records, not only of all the prisoners who had been incarcerated there, but also of all the individuals who had been locked up, banished into exile, or simply tried within the limits of Paris as a result of a lettre de cachet. Throughout the 18th century, archivists had been working zealously at keeping these records in good order and which, on the eve of the French revolution, had amounted to hundreds of thousands of documents. 

As the fortress was being ransacked, the pillaging lasted for two days during which documents were burned, torn, thrown from the top of towers into the moats and trailed through the mud. Many documents were stolen, or taken away by collectors, writers, lawyers, and even by Pierre Lubrowski, an attaché in the Russian embassy—who sold them to emperor Alexander I in 1805, when they were deposited at the Hermitage Palace—and many ended up dispersed throughout France and the rest of Europe. Fortunately, a company of soldiers was posted on 15 July to guard the fortress and, in particular, to prevent any more looting of the archives. On 16 July, the Electoral Assembly created a commission assigned to rescue the archives; on arrival at the fortress, they found that many boxes had been emptied or destroyed, leaving an enormous pile of papers in a complete state of disorder. During the session of 24 July, the Electoral Assembly passed a resolution enjoining citizens to return documents to the Hôtel de Ville; restitutions were numerous and the surviving documents eventually stored at the city's library, then located at the convent of Saint-Louis-de-la-Culture.

On 22 April 1797, Hubert-Pascal Ameilhon was appointed chief librarian of the Bibliothèque de l'Arsenal and obtained a decree that secured the Bastille archive under his care. However, the librarians were so daunted by this volume of 600,000 documents that they stored them in a backroom, where they languished for over forty years. In 1840, François Ravaisson found a mass of old papers under the floor in his kitchen at the Arsenal library and realised he had rediscovered the archives of the Bastille, which required a further fifty years of laborious restoration; the documents were numbered, and a catalogue was compiled and published as the 20th century was about to dawn. Eventually, the archives of the Bastille were made available for consultation by any visitor to the Arsenal library, in rooms specially fitted up for them.

Other archives
In addition to the Bibliothèque de l'Arsenal, several other archives host historical documents that were consulted by historians researching the enigma of the Man in the Iron Mask: the Archives of the Foreign Ministry (Archives des Affaires étrangères),
the Archives Nationales, 
the Bibliothèque nationale de France,
the Sainte-Geneviève Library,
and the Service Historique de la Défense ( Anciennes Archives de la Guerre).

Historians of the Man in the Iron Mask

In his historical essay published in 1965 and expanded in 1973, French novelist and playwright Marcel Pagnol singled out for particular praise a number of historians who consulted the archives with the goal of elucidating the enigma of the Man in the Iron Mask: Joseph Delort (1789–1847), Marius Topin (1838–1895), Théodore Iung (1833–1896), Maurice Duvivier (18??–1936), and Georges Mongrédien (1901–1980). Along with Pierre Roux-Fazillac (1746-1833), François Ravaisson (1811-1884), Jules Loiseleur (1816-1900), Jules Lair (1836–1907), and Frantz Funck-Brentano (1862–1947), these historians uncovered and published the bulk of historical documents that enabled some progress to be made towards that goal.

In particular, Mongrédien was the first to publish (1952) a complete reference of historical documents on which previous authors had relied only selectively. He was also one of the few historians who did not champion any particular candidate, preferring instead to review and analyse objectively the facts revealed by  the documents. Giving full credit to Jules Lair for being the first to propose the candidacy of "Eustache Dauger" in 1890, Mongrédien demonstrated that, among all the state prisoners who were ever in the care of Saint-Mars, only the one arrested under that pseudonym in 1669 could be the same who died in the Bastille in 1703, and was therefore the only possible candidate for the man in the mask. Although he also pointed out that no documents had yet been found that revealed either the real identity of this prisoner or the cause of his long incarceration, Mongrédien's work was significant in that it made it possible to eliminate all the candidates whose vital dates, and/or life circumstances for the period of 1669-1703, were already known to modern historians.

In October 1965, Mongrédien published a review, in the journal La Revue des Deux Mondes, of the first edition of Pagnol's essay. At the end of this review, Mongrédien mentioned being told that the Archives of the Ministry of Defense located at the Château de Vincennes still held unsorted and uncatalogued bundles of Louvois's correspondence. He speculated that, if this were the case, then these bundles might contain a letter from July 1669 revealing the reasons for "Eustache Daugers arrest near Dunkirk.

Modernisation of the archives
The National Archives of France has made the original data available online relating to the inventories of the goods and papers of : one inventory, of 64 pages, was drawn up at the Bastille in 1708; the other, of 68 pages, at the citadel of Sainte-Marguerite in 1691. These documents had been sought in vain for more than a century and were thought to have been lost. They show that some of the 800 documents in the possession of the jailer  were analysed after his death. They also give a description of a cell occupied by the masked prisoner, which contained only a sleeping mat, but no luxuries, as was previously thought.

In popular culture
Many films have been made around the mystery of the Man in the Iron Mask, most notably the 1998 film of the same name starring Leonardo DiCaprio, though others include The Iron Mask (1929), The Man in the Iron Mask (1939) and the 1977 British television production starring Richard Chamberlain as the titular prisoner.

The Man in the Iron Mask is portrayed as the Duc de Sullun (inversion of nullus, Latin for 'no one') in the first two episodes of the third season of the TV drama series Versailles. In the program, he is visited in the Bastille by Philippe I, Duke of Orléans on his search to find men to send to the Americas and is revealed to be the secret biological father of Louis XIV and Philippe I due to the inability of Louis XIII to produce an heir.

See also
 Ivan VI of Russia, a prisoner with a similar story

Explanatory footnotes

References

Citations

Sources

Books

AV Media

Websites

Magazines

Further reading

Books

Conference proceedings

Websites

External links

 
17th-century births
1703 deaths
17th-century French people
18th-century French people
People of the Ancien Régime
Prisoners and detainees of France
Unidentified people
French people who died in prison custody
French folklore
Masked people by occupation
Affair of the Poisons